Xymenopsis buccineus is a species of sea snail, a marine gastropod mollusk in the family Muricidae, the murex snails or rock snails.

Description

Distribution

References

External links
 Powell A. W. B. (1951). Antarctic and Subantarctic Mollusca: Pelecypoda and Gastropoda. Discovery Reports, 26: 47–196, pl. 5–10

Gastropods described in 1816
Xymenopsis